Schneider Electric DMS (full legal name: Schneider Electric DMS NS d.o.o) is a Serbian company that specializes in electricity distribution, automation management and produces installation components for energy management. It is headquartered in Novi Sad, Serbia.

History
The company was founded in 2002 and operated as part of French international company Schneider Electric. According to 2016 media reports, Schneider Electric DMS has close ties with professors at the Faculty of Technical Sciences, and thus has privileged position in graduates recruitment.

In November 2017, it celebrated its 15-year anniversary. In 2019, Schneider Electric acquired the remaining 43% of shares from the minority shareholder "DMS" for an undisclosed sum.

Since 22 May 2012, Schneider Electric DMS founded the Center for Young Talents foundation, a non-profit non-governmental organization based in Novi Sad whose goals are to contribute to the development of theoretical and practical knowledge in informatics, mathematics and other fields, to contribute to the improvement and practical implementation of the education system in the aforementioned fields, as well as to contribute to the permanent education and training of existing personnel. Originally the programming and math courses were classroom-only, until the 2016/17 school year when the first online classes for mathematics were held (PMUFO). Since 2019/20 school year, over 3,000 classes were held and had 2,881 registered participants on its educational portal.

References

External links
 
 Center for Young Talents foundation official site (in Serbian)

Companies based in Novi Sad
Electronics companies established in 2008
D.o.o. companies in Serbia
Electronics companies of Serbia
Engineering companies of Serbia
Schneider Electric DMS
Software companies of Serbia
Serbian companies established in 2008